Isoka is a town located in the Muchinga Province of Zambia near the borders with Tanzania and Malawi. It lies on the T2 Road (Tanzam Highway; Great North Road).

Area
The area of the district now (2020) is 5,091 km2.  The entire country is divided into administrative provinces, each sub-divided into districts, of which there are currently (2020) 116.  Previously, there were only 61, and before that, 57 (in about 1980).  Before that, there were fewer still.  Consequently, the area of the district has reduced over time. It is home town to Namwanga speaking people under Chief Kafwimbi.

Population
The district is populated mainly by Winamwanga, with some Wiwa, Nyika. and Tumbuka. The senior chief is Kafwimbi. The traditional ceremony called Ngondo is celebrated in the district.

History
The district town of Isoka is 70 miles from the border with Tangayika, which had been a German colony until 1918. During the Second World War, Isoka was the official border post.  Military convoys of up to 100 vehicles stopped at Isoka on their way to the battlefields in East Africa and the Western Desert.  The road then was untarred.

In 1966, Isoka had a secondary school, for boys only; it had no water supply, water was collected from the stream. The Great North Road between Tunduma in Tanzania and Kapiri Mposhi was still the only road connection.

References

Populated places in Muchinga Province